Victor Aubrey Wawn (13 March 1882 – 19 March 1947) was an Australian rules footballer who played with St Kilda in the Victorian Football League (VFL).

Death
He died at his residence in Waverley, New South Wales on 19 March 1947.

References

External links 

1882 births
1947 deaths
Australian rules footballers from Melbourne
St Kilda Football Club players
People from Brighton, Victoria
People educated at Wesley College (Victoria)